Eldin Jakupović (born 2 October 1984) is a Swiss professional footballer who plays as a goalkeeper for Major League Soccer club Los Angeles FC.

He started his professional career at Grasshopper Club Zürich in 2004, then moved to FC Thun a year later. After success there, Jakupović joined FC Lokomotiv Moscow in March 2006. He returned to Grasshoppers on loan spending two seasons there. In 2010, he moved to Greece joining Olympiakos Volou. In September 2011, after one season at Olympiakos Volou, he joined Aris. In 2012, he moved to Hull City. In 2017, he left Hull City after their relegation back to the EFL Championship to join Premier League side Leicester City. After leaving Leicester City, he joined fellow Premier League team Everton on a free transfer in September 2022.

Having played at under-21 level for both Bosnia and Switzerland, he earned his only senior cap for the latter in 2008, and was part of their squad at UEFA Euro 2008.

Club career

Early career
Jakupović was born in Kozarac, SFR Yugoslavia, present-day Bosnia and Herzegovina. He moved to Switzerland at a young age due to the Bosnian War and started his professional career at Grasshopper Club Zürich in 2004. He then moved to FC Thun in 2005. After a successful spell at FC Thun, Jakupović joined FC Lokomotiv Moscow in March 2006.

Grasshoppers
Jakupović returned to former club to Grasshopper Club Zürich on a year-long loan on 30 August 2007. He scored a 94th-minute equaliser against BSC Young Boys in his third match for the club, earning Grasshoppers a 3–3 draw. During the season Jakupović forced Fabio Coltorti to the bench as his backup. At the end of the 2007–08 season, Jakupović extended his loan at Grasshoppers for another year, which meant new signing goalkeeper Massimo Colomba was benched.

Lokomotiv return
On 31 August 2009, Jakupović was confirmed as part of the Lokomotiv Moscow squad, with Ivan Pelizzoli leaving on loan to join AlbinoLeffe. Due to the number of foreigners in the Lokomotiv squad, Jakupović was asked to go out on loan again. In December, Jakupović went on trial at Tottenham Hotspur and had a successful week. However, due to various reasons a deal could not be completed with Lokomotiv Moscow. After a turbulent time with the Lokomotiv management, Jakupović was allowed to be released.

Olympiakos Volou
Jakupović had a fine season with Olympiakos Volou. After they were relegated to the Delta Ethniki, Jakupović left the team.

Aris
On 30 September 2011, Jakupović joined Aris, with three other ex-teammates, Noe Acosta, Javier Umbides and Khalifa Sankare. He made his debut on 5 November 2011, against Olympiakos SFP, which finished 2–3.

Hull City
On 20 March 2012, Jakupović joined English Championship club Hull City on trial, and after impressing in training and a friendly match Hull manager Nick Barmby expressed a desire to sign Jakupović on a permanent contract. Following the sacking of Nick Barmby, Jakupović had trials with Ipswich Town. On 9 July 2012, Jakupović signed for Hull City on a two-year contract, becoming Steve Bruce's first full signing as manager. He officially joined the team on their pre-season training session in Portugal. He made his debut in a 3–1 friendly win against North Ferriby United on 16 July 2012. His first Championship match for The Tigers came on 21 December 2012 at Derby County, when he played in a 2–1 victory as Hull moved into second place in the Championship table. This was followed up by three more league appearances, all of which consisted of clean sheets.

In January 2014 Jakupović joined Leyton Orient on loan until 8 February. On 29 January 2014, Jakupović was recalled to parent club Hull City. On 13 February 2014, Jakupović re-joined Leyton Orient until 17 May 2014, but was again recalled on 27 March 2014.

On 9 July 2014, Jakupović signed a new two-year contract with Hull City, and began their Premier League campaign as third-choice goalkeeper behind Allan McGregor and Steven Harper. He made his first appearance of the season on 18 October away to Arsenal as a substitute when Harper injured his arm before half-time, and did not concede until Danny Welbeck equalised for 2–2 in added time. A week later he started for the first time in the division, keeping a clean sheet in a goalless draw against Liverpool.

Jakupović started for Hull against Arsenal in the FA Cup fifth round on 20 February 2016, at the Emirates Stadium. He made 12 saves to earn his side a 0–0 draw, which led to a replay at the KC Stadium.

On 24 June 2016, Jakupović signed a new two-year deal with Hull City. Since McGregor was out with a back injury that ruled him out for about six months, Jakupović started off the 2016–17 season against Premier League Champions, Leicester City and helped earn the Tigers a 2–1 victory on opening day.

Leicester City
In July 2017, following Hull City's relegation back to the second tier of English football, Jakupović signed a three-year deal with Premier League side Leicester City. He made his debut in the FA Cup third round match against Fleetwood Town. He signed a one-year contract extension in June 2020.

On 10 June 2022, it was announced that Jakupović would be released from Leicester City upon expiry of his contract at the end of the month.

Everton
Jakupović's Leicester contract expired in June 2022. Two months later he signed for Everton until the end of the year as a back-up keeper, following injuries to first and third choices Jordan Pickford and Andy Lonergan.

Los Angeles FC
On 9 January 2023, Jakupović signed a one-year contract with Los Angeles FC.

International career

Jakupović has dual citizenship, both Bosnian and Swiss, and has represented both at under-21 level.

He has played for Bosnia and Herzegovina U21 for two competitive matches, and a friendly match against Austria U21 for Switzerland on 1 March 2006.

In August 2005, Jakupović received his first call-up to the Bosnia and Herzegovina national squad which was a match against Belgium and Lithuania, however he did not accept the call up. In March 2007, Jakupović was asked again to play for the senior Bosnia and Herzegovina against Norway, but declined the offer. Jakupović was included in the Swiss UEFA Euro 2008 squad. He made his debut on 20 August 2008 in a friendly match against Cyprus. He was called up for the first two matches of 2010 FIFA World Cup qualification, but was an unused substitute.

In October 2008, Jakupović said that he would not play again for the Swiss national team due to family reasons.

Career statistics

Club

International

Honours
Hull City
Football League Championship play-offs: 2016

References

External links

Official UEFA player page

1984 births
Living people
People from Prijedor
Bosnia and Herzegovina emigrants to Switzerland
Association football goalkeepers
Bosnia and Herzegovina footballers
Bosnia and Herzegovina under-21 international footballers
Swiss men's footballers
Switzerland under-21 international footballers
Switzerland international footballers
UEFA Euro 2008 players
Grasshopper Club Zürich players
FC Thun players
FC Lokomotiv Moscow players
Olympiacos Volos F.C. players
Aris Thessaloniki F.C. players
Hull City A.F.C. players
Leyton Orient F.C. players
Leicester City F.C. players
Everton F.C. players
Los Angeles FC players
Swiss Super League players
Russian Premier League players
Super League Greece players
English Football League players
Premier League players
Swiss expatriate footballers
Expatriate footballers in Russia
Swiss expatriate sportspeople in Russia
Expatriate footballers in Greece
Swiss expatriate sportspeople in Greece
Expatriate footballers in England
Swiss expatriate sportspeople in England